The Shanghai–Suzhou–Huzhou high-speed railway or Husuhu high-speed railway (沪苏湖铁路) is a high-speed railway in China. It is expected to be completed in July 2024.

History
Construction began in June 2020.

Stations

References

High-speed railway lines in China
High-speed railway lines under construction